Summit Lake is a lake in the Michipicoten River system in the Lake Superior drainage basin located at Goudreau in the Unorganized North Part of Algoma District, Ontario, Canada. The primary inflow is McVeigh Creek from Spring Lake, and the primary outflow is McVeigh Creek to Philip Lake, which flows via the Hawk River and Michipicoten River into Lake Superior. The Algoma Central Railway runs along the east shore of the lake.

See also
List of lakes in Ontario

References

Lakes of Algoma District